BTR is the debut studio album by pop boy band Big Time Rush. Released on October 11, 2010, the track listing for the album was announced on September 1, 2010. The album was preceded by the release of several singles from the TV show soundtrack. On December 3, 2009, the band released their eponymous song as the album's promotional single. The first single, "Til I Forget About You", was released on September 21, 2010. On October 11, 2010, "Boyfriend", which features vocals from rapper Snoop Dogg, was the second official single from the album and has become the band's biggest hit to date, charting on the Billboard Hot 100 as well as reaching the Top 40 of the Pop Songs music chart in the US. Despite not being released as a single, the song "Big Night" charted on the Billboard Hot 100, peaking at number seventy-nine.

Background
BTR had been in the making since 2009, when the four members signed on for the show, Big Time Rush. The boys worked with composers and producers such as Emanuel Kiriakou, Lucas Secon, Matthew Gerrard, Kevin Rudolf, Edwin "Lil Eddie" Serrano,  Jeremy Skaller, Robert Larow, Stuart Grekin, Chris Rojas, The Messengers, Eric Sanicola, S*A*M and Sluggo, Timothy Foxx, Jordan Delani and Scott Fellows (the creator of the group). While working on the album, the band released many of the songs as promotional singles onto iTunes, as well as debuted them on their television series. This provided great promotion for the band's music, and led to three hit songs, "Halfway There", "Boyfriend", "Big Night", to begin charting on the Billboard Hot 100.

As seen on their television series, the band worked with many well known celebrities, such as Jordin Sparks, who recorded a song with the boys titled "Count On You". When asked about the collaboration, James stated Jordin is an unbelievable singer. If you hear her sing in real life, she sounds just as good live every time. She absolutely deserves to be where she is. She's so talented, and she's a sweetheart too. We're on the same label. She wanted to get into acting, so we wrote an episode about her. She came on and was a great actress. The song is one of our first group ballads. It's a five-way ballad, but it turned out pretty cool. Usually, a duet has one person on each side. This has her voice one side and then there are our four voices on the other [Laughs]. It worked out though. It was such a pleasure to have Jordin on the song. She became a good friend of mine. She took me to the actual show before she was in it last time [Laughs]. She's so down-to-earth like that.

On September 1, the album track listing for the standard version was released online. Most of the band's songs featured on the TV Show were included on the album, which also served as the soundtrack to the First Season and part of the Second Season of the series. The songs "Any Kind of Guy", and "Famous", the latter of which is a cover of the Play song, were included on the international release of the album, along with the songs "This Is Our Someday", and "Stuck" (the last one exclusively to the UK and in some iTunes stores around the world). The previously recorded track which featured Jordin Sparks was listed on the album, along with another duet with R&B artist Cymphonique.

The second track on the album, "Boyfriend", was originally recorded and released as a solo song; however, upon being released as a single, two new versions of the song leaked onto the internet. The first version featured rapper Snoop Dogg, who appeared in an episode of Big Time Rush with the band. The second leaked version of the song featured the same artist and rapping duo New Boyz. It was initially unknown which of the two would be released as the official single; however, a reworked version which featured Snoop Dogg served as the album's official second single and also a new edit of the song including just New Boyz as collaborating artists was released as a digital single on iTunes. Both official versions were later included on the international releases of the album.

Composition
The music found on the album is mainly pop oriented, as well as R&B. The music found on the album is child-appropriate, as it serves as not only their debut album, but the soundtrack to their self-titled series. Jessica Dawson of Common Sense Media said of the songs on the album, "Not since 'N Sync or the Backstreet Boys has there been a boy band making such a sudden splash in the tweenage music world. Big Time Rush is a standout, not only because of their boyish charm and good looks, but because their music is a cool blend of synth-pop, hip hop, and boy-band harmonies. 'City is Ours' is already a digital hit, and 'Count On You' with Jordin Sparks is a catchy collaboration about earning your place in a relationship. With a hit TV show to showcase their music and their adorable personalities, Big Time Rush won't be in a hurry out of the spotlight. Parents need to know that this boy band is making tween hearts swoon with their hit Nickelodeon TV show, Big Time Rush. In their debut album they sing about relationships, going out, and making the most of your life, but it's all clean and age-appropriate for young fans."

Critical reception

BTR was met with generally positive reception from critics. Matt Collar of AllMusic praised the album, stating "The self-titled debut album from the Nickelodeon boy band Big Time Rush features many of the dance-pop tunes popularized on the band's TV show of the same name. Showcasing the talents of singers Kendall Schmidt, James Maslow , Carlos Pena, Jr., and Logan Henderson, BTR is a fairly accessible listen that falls somewhere between the soulful alt-rock of OneRepublic and the electro-influenced pop of Katy Perry. These are catchy, sweet, radio and club-friendly tracks that, while aimed at "tweens," should appeal to most any fan of well-crafted dance-pop. To these ends, you get the synth-driven leadoff track "Til I Forget About You," the head-bobbin' "Boyfriend", and the yearning club anthem "Nothing Even Matters", among other highlights."

Caroline Sullivan of The Guardian gave the album a more negative review. She stated, "What isn't fine is how horribly generic the music is." However, she complimented the song "Boyfriend" featuring Snoop Dogg calling the track "wholesome-sounding."

Commercial performance
In the United States, BTR sold 67,000 copies in the first week, debuting at number 3 on the Billboard 200 and easily became one of the highest charting debut albums of the year in 2010. The album stayed 57 weeks on the Billboard chart. As of 2012, the album has sold 700,000 copies in the U.S.. It also charted in Mexico, on the Dutch Albums Chart, in Austria, Switzerland, Germany, the UK, Greece, Ireland, Italy, Portugal and Scottish album charts amongst others. The album received a platinum plaque by the Recording Industry Association of America (RIAA) for sales and streaming of 1,000,000 units.

Promotion
To promote the album, Big Time Rush embarked on many promotional tours. Member James said of the tour, "Everybody can expect us to be playing 3–5 songs at every high school we're stopping at. Then we're going to be doing a signing. We're in between filming, and that's the crazy part. We're in the middle of the second season. It's going to a pretty fun month for us! I hope people are excited for us to come to their towns. This is going to be done by the end of the month with filming in between, but we absolutely be back on the road with a full set soon." In another attempt to promote the album, the band appeared on Today, where they performed their songs "Til I Forget About You" and "Big Night". The band also performed their latest single, "Boyfriend", at the 2011 Kids' Choice Awards. Rapper Snoop Dogg, who is featured on the single, appeared at the awards show to perform along with the band.

Among these performances, the band also performed at the 2010 Macy's Thanksgiving Day Parade. Also, the band recently announced yet another tour. However, this tour will be their first headlining tour, and will begin immediately after filming of the second season of Big Time Rush is over.

Singles
"Til I Forget About You" was officially released as lead single on September 21, 2010 but a week later, on September 29, 2010 the promotional single was finally released as physical CD Single in the U.S., making it the first ever official commercialized single. The tracklist included the album version, and the B-side song "Famous".

"Boyfriend" was released as second single for digital download as well as mainstream radio on February 15, 2011. The single version features Snoop Dogg. However, the album version is done solely by the band. Another version of the song leaked, which featured vocals from rapping duo New Boyz. "Boyfriend" so far peaked at seventy-two on the Billboard Hot 100, becoming their most successful song to date. "Boyfriend" made it to number thirty on the Billboard Pop Songs chart in April 2011.

The third and final single, "Worldwide", was only released over seas as both digital, and physical single. The tracklist included the album version, and a remix from the song "Till I Forget About You". Although it didn't debut on the Billboard Hot 100 singles chart in the US, it peaked at number 81 on the German Top 100 singles chart on August 19, 2011.

Promotional singles
"Big Time Rush" was released on December 3, 2009, as the first promotional single to promote the airing of the new series. It became a minor digital hit, when digital downloads led to its debut at number sixteen on the Bubbling Under Hot 100 singles chart and sold 215,000 copies in the US. "Any Kind of Guy", "Halfway There", "Famous" and "City Is Ours" were also released as promotional singles. "Big Time Rush" and "Any Kind of Guy" sold 215,000 and 94,000 copies respectively in the US as of 2010.

Other songs
"Big Night" wasn't released as single, but peaked 79 on Billboard Hot 100 during the week of the album's release due to over 46,000 downloaded copies sold. The song debuted at seventy-nine on the chart, making it their second highest charting single to date, with "Boyfriend" being their highest (at number seventy-two on the chart).

Track listing

Charts

Weekly charts

Year-end charts

Certifications

Release history

References

2010 debut albums
Sony Music albums
Albums produced by Matthew Gerrard
Albums produced by S*A*M and Sluggo
Big Time Rush albums